The Multiwavelength Atlas of Galaxies is a textbook and atlas of 35 well studied galaxies (including our Galaxy) authored by Glen Mackie of the Centre for Astrophysics & Supercomputing, Swinburne University of Technology. It was originally published in 2011 by Cambridge University Press.

Atlas scope
The purpose of the atlas is to display and describe some of the best multiwavelength images of galaxies. The images originate from a variety of telescopes, instruments and detectors, and therefore possess wide ranges of signal-to-noise, angular resolution, sampling or pixel sizes and fields of view. The atlas is a compendium of galaxy images spanning the Gamma ray, X-ray, Ultraviolet, Optical, Infrared, Submillimeter and Radio regions of the electromagnetic spectrum.

The atlas has been favourably reviewed in the Royal Astronomical Society journal, Astronomy & Geophysics. Creating the atlas was a long term project  ten years in the making. Background on the genesis of the atlas can be found in an interview with the author in the Swinburne University of Technology Venture magazine. It is recommended for graduate students and above.

Explanatory text describes how different radiation is produced, which objects (i.e. cold, warm or hot gas, dust, stars, particles, atoms and molecules) it originates from, and what types of telescopes are used to detect it. The galaxies are divided into categories of Normal (N), Interacting (I), Merging (M), Starburst (S) and Active (A), though many have been classified across one or more categories. The reasons for inclusion of a galaxy into a specific category is explained in the individual galaxy summaries in the Atlas.

Galaxy types

Normal galaxies include galaxies that appear morphologically normal, do not possess unusual star formation rates, and have continuum spectra with a thermal (stellar) form characterized by one or more temperatures. Twelve N classified galaxies are in the Atlas.

Interacting galaxies display morphological signatures of a gravitational interaction with another nearby galaxy or are influenced by the passage through a dense medium that can 'strip out' constituent gas. Four I classified galaxies are in the Atlas.

Merging galaxies are the later evolutionary stages of two or more Interacting galaxies that have orbits and dynamics conducive to a final merger. Five M classified galaxies are in the Atlas.

Starburst galaxies undergo intense star formation that is well in excess of normal rates. Large numbers of young stars (O and B spectral type) exist and the dust content can be extremely high. Three S classified galaxies are in the Atlas.

Active galaxies have Active Galactic Nuclei (AGN) and include LINER, Seyfert, Radio Galaxy, Quasar and Blazar types. 'Activity' refers to non-stellar processes occurring or originating in a galaxy nucleus. An active nucleus has a spectrum with a continuum that cannot be explained by radiation from one or more stellar (or blackbody) objects. Eleven A classified galaxies are in the Atlas. Active galaxies typically have strong emission over a large portion of the electromagnetic spectrum making them prime targets for multiwavelength observations. Hence galaxies categorised Active make up a large fraction (31%) of the Atlas sample, and comprise 43% of the total sample if other Atlas galaxies with activity as a sub-category are included.

Radiation from all regions of the electromagnetic spectrum has now been detected from galaxies. These observations have utilized telescopes at ground-based observatories (many located at high altitude mountain sites), telescopes in aircraft (≥10 km altitude), detectors on balloons that voyaged to the upper atmosphere (30–40 km altitude), instrument payloads on rockets that reached space, observatory satellites in Earth and Solar orbit as well as instruments aboard planetary missions journeying through the Solar System.

List of galaxies in the Multiwavelength Atlas of Galaxies 

Notes to Table:

Group/Cluster: LG: Local Group; Sth. Polar Grp.: South Polar Group, also known as the Sculptor Group; Pers. Cl.: Perseus Cluster.

Right Ascension and Declination: From a Revised Shapley-Ames Catalog
of Bright Galaxies (RSA; Sandage and Tammann 1981), when available, 
or else from the SIMBAD astronomical database except for the Galaxy (coordinates of Sagittarius A*, from Mezger et al. 1996).

Type: Where possible galaxy types are taken from RSA.
This classification scheme is the revised Hubble system (Sandage 1961, 1975). 
The exceptions, NGC 2915 (Blue Compact Dwarf, BCD, Meurer, Mackie and Carignan 1994); 
the Galaxy (Sbc/SBbc, de Vaucouleurs 1970); 
Malin 2 (Low Surface Brightness, LSB, McGaugh and Bothun 1994) are indicated with types 
given in [ ].

v0: The corrected recession velocity relative to the Local 
Group centroid, in km s−1 from RSA.
Redshifts (z) are given in [ ] when v0 is not listed in RSA.
Velocities for NGC 2915 and Malin 2 are from the NASA/IPAC Extragalactic Database (NED) and are heliocentric.

Distance: In Mpc from Tully (1988), except for the Galaxy
(Mezger et al. 1996); LMC (50 kpc. Note: Panagia et al. 1991; distance to SN
1987A, D(1987A) = 51.2±3.1 kpc); SMC (Rowan-Robinson 1985); Malin 2 (McGaugh and Bothun 1994); 
NGC 1275 and NGC 7252 (where
D = v0/75.0 Mpc); and NGC 4676, 3C 273, A1795#1, Arp 220, 
Cygnus A (where D = v/75.0 Mpc, and v = c [(z+1)2 - 1]/[(z+1)2 + 1]

Other Categories: N - Normal, I - Interacting, M - Merging, S - Starburst, A - Active.

References for Table:

McGaugh, S.S., and Bothun, G.D. 1994, A. J., 107, 530.
Mezger, P.G., Duschl, W.J. and Zylka, R. 1996, Astron. Ap. Review, 7, 289. 
Panagia, N. et al. 1991, Ap. J., 380, L23. 
Rowan-Robinson, M. 1985, 'The Cosmological Distance Ladder', (New York: Freeman). p. 153.
Sandage, A. and Tammann, G. A. 1981, A Revised Shapley-Ames Catalog of Bright Galaxies, (Carnegie Institute of Washington, Washington, D.C.) (RSA) 
Tully, R.B. 1988, Nearby Galaxies Catalog, (Cambridge University Press, Cambridge).

See also 

Messier object (M)
New General Catalogue (NGC)
Atlas of Peculiar Galaxies (Arp)

References

External links 

The Multiwavelength Milky Way
NGC 300 research summary and slide set
NGC 1316 research summary and slide set
NGC 3031/M 81 research summary and slide set
NGC 4676 research summary and slide set
NGC 5236/M 83 research summary and slide set
The Multiwavelength Atlas of Galaxies, by Glen Mackie
Book Availability

Astronomical catalogues of galaxies